Phalonidia fariasana is a species of moth of the family Tortricidae. It is found in Tamaulipas, Mexico.

The wingspan is about 18 mm. The ground colour of the forewings is white, in distal and mediocostal parts suffused with grey, in the basal fourth yellowish cream with brown marks and in the terminal third pale ferruginous. The hindwings are pale brownish grey with pale brown-grey strigulation (fine streaks).

Etymology
The species name refers to Gomez Farias, the type locality.

References

Moths described in 2007
Phalonidia